The House of Arnim is the name of an ancient German noble family, originally from Altmark, part of the mediaeval March of Brandenburg. Members of the family occupied many important positions within Holy Roman Empire, Saxony, Prussia, German Empire and the German Reich.

History 
They are one of the oldest extant Prussian noble families, being first attested to in 1204. On 2 October 1786, one branch of the family was raised to the title of Count in Prussia by King Frederick William II, while a second branch was raised to the same title in 1870 by King William I of Prussia. The Count von Arnim-Boitzenburg was one of the hereditary members of the Prussian House of Lords from 1852-1918, when it was dissolved. Numerous branches of the family still exist today. Perhaps the most famous member of the family was the novelist, Countess Elizabeth von Arnim-Schlagenthin.

Properties

Notable members 

 Hans Georg von Arnim-Boitzenburg (1583–1641), German field marshal, diplomat, and politician
 Ludwig Achim von Arnim (1781–1831), German poet and novelist
 Bettina von Arnim (1785–1859), German writer and novelist
 Heinrich Friedrich von Arnim-Heinrichsdorff-Werbelow (1791-1859) a Prussian statesman
 Adolf Heinrich von Arnim-Boitzenburg (1803–1868), German statesman
 Ferdinand von Arnim (1814–1866), German architect and watercolour-painter
 Gisela von Arnim (1827–1889), German writer
 Bernd von Arnim (died 1917), German naval officer
 Friedrich Bertram Sixt von Armin (1851–1936), German World War I general
 Hans-Heinrich Sixt von Armin (1890–1952), German World War II general
 Hans-Jürgen von Arnim (1889–1962), German World War II general
 Iris von Arnim (born 1945), German fashion designer
 Arnulf von Arnim (born 1947), German classical pianist and teacher

References 

German noble families
European noble families
Prussian nobility
Arnim family